Just Gammat is an Indian Marathi language film directed by Milind Arun Kavade and produced by Seema Shrivastav. The film stars Sanjay Narvekar, Jitendra Joshi, Smita Gondkar and Aditi Sarangdhar. Music by Nitin Kumar Gupta. The film was released on 28 March 2015.

Synopsis 
Two friends cross paths after a long time and decide to get drunk together. In their drunken stupor, they plan to kill each other's wives but face hilarious challenges in their quest

Cast 
 Sanjay Narvekar as Mohan
 Jitendra Joshi as Ashok 
 Smita Gondkar as Meera
 Aditi Sarangdhar
 Atul todankar
 Deepak Shirke
 Vijay Patkar
 Aarti Solanki
 Jaywant Wadkar
 Arun Kadam
 Sanjay Kulkarni
 Heena Panchal as special appearance

Soundtrack

Critical response 
Just Gammat film received negative reviews from critics. A reviewer from The Times of India gave the film a rating of 2/5 and wrote "If you are looking for strong content and powerful performances, this is definitely not your cup of tea. Watch it if you have to". Ganesh Matkari of Pune Mirror wrote "The screenplay is senseless, dialogues unfunny and situations unbelievable. I know that any film needs some suspension of disbelief on part of the audience". A reviewer from Loksatta wrote "While writing the four main characters, no attempt has been made to give personality to the characters, which are necessary to impress the audience". A Reviewer of Zee Talkies wrote "Good art work, a tasteful background score and sound design by Santosh Phutane, Salil Amrute and Anil Nikam, respectively, are the plus points of this film. ‘Just Gammat’ therefore turned out to be an average entertainer".

References

External links
 
 

2015 films
2010s Marathi-language films
Indian drama films